The 2020 Wareham Forest fire was a forest fire in Wareham Forest, Dorset, in May 2020. It destroyed over 220 Hectares of the forest, and was described a "one of the most devastating fires in Dorset, in living memory" by Dorset and Wiltshire Fire and Rescue Service.

Fire 
The fire started as a result of a disposable barbecue or campfire before 12:20 on 18 May 2020. The site where it started, near Sugar Hill, contained both these items, as well as glass bottles, and the cause of the fire was ascribed to 'social activity'. The initial attendance was 14 fire engines, as well as police resource to close Sugar Hill/Bere Road, which runs between the A35 and Wareham, and had been made impassable due to smoke.

By 15:40, the number of fire engines had increased to fourteen, with more than 100 firefighters in attendance, including some from Yeovil, part of the neighbouring Devon and Somerset Fire and Rescue Service. Smoke could be seen from as far away as Poole. At 16:40, more police assets were attending, including the Dorset Police Marine Policing Team and the National Police Air Service helicopter.

At 18:00, the fire had worsened due to strong prevailing winds and the fire had started to disrupt electricity supplies in the area. It now covered approximately 100 hectares of heath and woodland, and 150 firefighters were involved, including most of the fire engines in Dorset and several from Dorset & Somerset and Hampshire. Specifically, there were 28 in total:

 Fire engines from Bere Regis, Wareham (two), Wimborne, Christchurch (two), Poole (three), Weymouth, Westbourne, Blandford (two), Dorchester (two), Swanage (two), Ferndown, Redhill Park, Sturminster Newton (two), Shaftesbury, Bridport (two), Verwood, Springbourne, Warminster and New Milton
 a specialist £230,000 Unimog from Wareham
 water carriers from Poole, Christchurch, Bridport and Yeovil
 Land Rover pumps from Poole, Hamworthy, Wimborne, Swanage, Ferndown, Blandford, Christchurch, Beaminster and Charmouth
 support units from Hamworthy, Sherborne and Ferndown
 a high volume pump from Christchurch

The fire was declared a "major incident" shortly after it was discovered, and by the end of the first day, the fire had spread to 183 hectares, and the smoke plume was affecting people as far away as Bournemouth, Ferndown and Wimborne. The main trunk road through Dorset, the A35, was closed by police. The fire needed special precautions to fight, as a major National Grid power line ran through the middle of the fire.

Lasting effects 
By 19 May, the fire had been brought under control. Firefighters had started to deal with the "deep-rooted hotspots, burning roots and tree stumps", and some thought could start to be given to the damage caused. Forestry England, who managed the land, pointed out that the 1,500 hectare forest was the one of the only places in the UK where all six species of British reptile - the common lizard, sand lizard, slow worm, grass snake, adder and smooth snake - live. A third of the forest is a Site of Special Scientific Interest, and is known for ladybird spiders and ground nesting birds such as woodlark. The site also contains 9 Scheduled Ancient Monuments. Ecologists were called in to try and rescue any animals which may have survived. The Amphibian and Reptile Conservation Trust said that this would be the worst fire in Dorset in 30 years, and the Dorset Wildlife Trust pointed out that the loss of habitats during breeding season would mean the habitat would take decades to recover.

The fire service finally withdrew from the fire on 4 June 2020, seventeen days after the fire started. 220 hectares of forest had been burned. Firefighters from all 50 station in Dorset and Wiltshire were used, totalling 70 of the 74 engines, all eight heavy off-road pumps and all 14 Land Rover pumps. 22 crew from other counties also attended. Also in attendance was a Forestry England fire-fighting helicopter, Wildfire Tactical Advisors from Hampshire, West Sussex and South Wales, a tactical burn team, and nine separate drone deployments by the fire service, Dorset Police and Wiltshire Police. Several miles of hose had to be laid to the nearby River Piddle.

The total cost to the fire service was at least £500,000.

References 

Wildfires in the United Kingdom
2020 fires in the United Kingdom
Wareham, Dorset
Fires in England